Hirai Station is the name of two train stations in Japan:

 Hirai Station (Ehime)
 Hirai Station (Tokyo)